Jeffrey Lane is an author, television scriptwriter, film producer and actor. He is a graduate of Wesleyan University.

Career

Broadway
Lane wrote the book for the musical Dirty Rotten Scoundrels, which ran on Broadway in 2005 and was nominated for the Tony Award for Best Musical.  He has written the book for the musical adaptation Women on the Verge of a Nervous Breakdown, which was nominated for three Tony Awards and numerous Drama Desk Awards. Laura Benanti won the Drama Desk Award for Outstanding Actress in a Musical.

Television
Lane wrote and produced for many television series and shows, including Mad About You, Ryan's Hope, Lou Grant, and The Days and Nights of Molly Dodd. He was initially came up with the concept of Ink, but he was replaced by Diane English at the last minute.
Writer
Lou Grant (1977) TV Series
Ryan's Hope (hired by Claire Labine)
The Mississippi (1983) TV Series
Partners in Crime (1984) TV Series...  50/50 (Europe)
The American Film Institute Salute to Gene Kelly (1985) (TV) ... a.k.a. The Best of Gene Kelly (UK: video box title)
The Days and Nights of Molly Dodd (1987) TV Series
The Murder of Mary Phagan (1988) (TV)
Sunday Times
Same Time Next Week
Mad About You
Bette
Loco por ti

Producer
The American Film Institute Salute to Gregory Peck (1989) (TV) (co-producer)
Mad About You (1992) TV Series (executive producer)
Bette (2000) TV Series (executive producer)

Miscellaneous
Ryan's Hope (1975) TV Series (production assistant)
The American Film Institute Salute to Gene Kelly (1985) (TV) (production associate) ... a.k.a. The Best of Gene Kelly (UK: video box title)

Actor
Forever Evil (1987) .... Jay

Awards
The AFI Lifetime Achievement Award
 2005 Tony Award for Best Book of a Musical, Dirty Rotten Scoundrels (nominee)
 Five Emmy Awards 
 Three Writers Guild of America Awards
Two Peabodys
Golden Globe
The Christopher Award

References

External links
 Production: Dirty Rotten Scoundrels - Working in the Theatre Seminar video at American Theatre Wing.org, April 2005

Wesleyan University alumni
American soap opera writers
Living people
Year of birth missing (living people)